Luis Santana (born November 19, 1958 in La Romana, Dominican Republic), is a retired professional boxer who fought in the super welterweight (154lb) division. He was the World Boxing Council's world Super Welterweight champion.

Career
Santana turned pro in 1981 and challenged Simon Brown for the IBF Welterweight Title
in 1989, but lost a unanimous decision.

In 1994 he got another title shot against WBC Light Middleweight Title holder Terry Norris and won the title when Norris was disqualified in the 5th round for downing Santana with an illegal blow to the back of the head or rabbit punch. After a lengthy delay, the ringside doctor ruled Santana unable to continue. Norris, along with some media members, believed that Santana was faking the injury in order to win the championship and presumably, a rematch fight with Norris. In 1995 they fought a rematch, and again Norris was disqualified for hitting Santana after the bell to end Round 3 had sounded. Later that year they again rematched, and Norris dominated the fight, winning by 2nd round TKO. Santana fought three more times and retired in 1999.

|-

 
|-

See also 
 List of WBC world champions

References

External links 
 

Living people
Light-middleweight boxers
World boxing champions
1958 births
People from La Romana, Dominican Republic
Dominican Republic male boxers